The 2014 Vermont Senate election took place as part of the biennial United States elections. Vermont voters elected State Senators in all 30 seats. State senators serve two-year terms in the Vermont Senate. The election coincided with elections for other offices including the  U.S. House, Governor, and State House. A primary election held on August 26, 2014 determined which candidates appeared on the November 4 general election ballot.

Following the 2012 Senate elections, Democrats maintained control of the Senate with 23 members in the majority caucus (21 Democrats and 2 Progressives). To claim control of the chamber from Democrats, the Republicans would have needed to net gain 8 or 9 seats depending on the winner of the 2014 Vermont lieutenant gubernatorial election, which was Republican Phil Scott. The Republicans gained 2 seats from the Democrats.

Results summary

Incumbents defeated in the general election
Eldred French (D-Rutland), defeated by Brian Collamore (R)

Open seats that changed parties
Donald Collins (D-Franklin) didn't seek re-election, seat won by Dustin Degree (R)

Detailed results

Addison
Elects 2 senators.
Incumbent Democrats Claire Ayer, who has represented the Addison district since 2003, and Christopher Bray, who has represented the Addison district since 2013, were re-elected.

Bennington
Elects 2 senators.
Incumbent Democrats  Dick Sears, who has represented the Bennington district since 1993, was re-elected. Incumbent Democrat Robert Hartwell, who has represented the Bennington district since 2007, retired. Fellow Democrat Brian Campion won the open seat.

Caledonia
Incumbent Democrat Jane Kitchel, who has represented the Caledonia district since 2005, and incumbent Republican Minority Leader Joe Benning, who has represented the Caledonia district since 2011, were both re-elected.
Elects 2 senators.

Chittenden
Elects 6 senators.
Incumbent incumbent Democrats Ginny Lyons, who has represented the Chittenden district since 2001, Tim Ashe, who has represented the Chittenden district since 2009, Phil Baruth, who has represented the Chittenden district since 2011, and Michael Sirotkin, who has represented the Chittenden district since 2014, were all re-elected. Progressive David Zuckerman, who has represented the Chittenden district since 2013, and  Incumbent Republican Diane Snelling, who has represented the Chittenden district since 2003, were also re-elected.

Essex-Orleans
Elects 2 senators.
Incumbent Democrats Robert Starr, who has represented the Essex-Orleans district since 2005, and John Rodgers, who has represented the Essex-Orleans district since 2013, were both re-elected.

Franklin
Elects 2 senators.
Incumbent Republican Norm McAllister, who has represented the Franklin district since 2013, was re-elected. Incumbent Democrat Donald Collins, who has represented the Franklin district since 2013, retired. Republican Dustin Degree won the open seat.

Grand Isle
Elects 1 senator.
Incumbent Democrat Richard Mazza, who has represented the Grand Isle district since 1985, was re-elected.

Lamoille
Elects 1 senator.
Incumbent Republican Richard Westman, who has represented the Lamoille district since 2011, was re-elected.

Orange
Elects 1 senator.
Incumbent Democrat Mark MacDonald, who has represented the Orange district since 2003, was re-elected.

Rutland
Elects 3 senators.
Incumbent Republicans Peg Flory, who has represented the Rutland district since 2011, and Kevin Mullin, who has represented the Rutland district since 2003, were both re-elected. Incumbent Democrat Eldred French, who has represented the Rutland district since 2013, lost re-election to Republican Brian Collamore won the open seat.

Washington
Elects 3 senators.
Incumbent Republican Bill Doyle, who has represented the Washington district since 1969, incumbent Democrat Ann Cummings, who has represented the Washington district since 1997, and incumbent Progressive Minority Leader Anthony Pollina, who has represented the Washington district since 2011, were all re-elected.

Windham
Elects 2 senators.
Incumbent Democrat Jeanette White, who has represented the Windham district since 2003, was re-elected. Incumbent Democrat Peter Galbraith, who has represented the Windham district since 2011, retired. Fellow Democrat Becca Balint won the open seat.

Windsor
Elects 3 senators.
Incumbent Democrats Alice Nitka, who has represented the windsor district since 2007, and Richard McCormack, who has represented the Windsor district since 2007, and Senate President pro tempore John Campbell, who has represented the Windsor district since 2001, were re-elected.

See also
2014 United States elections
2014 Vermont elections
2014 United States House of Representatives election in Vermont
2014 Vermont gubernatorial election
2014 Vermont House of Representatives election

References

Senate
Vermont Senate elections
Vermont Senate